The 1923 Ludlow by-election was a parliamentary by-election for the British House of Commons constituency of Ludlow, Shropshire, on 19 April 1923.

Vacancy
The by-election was caused by the succession to the peerage of the sitting Unionist MP, Ivor Windsor-Clive on 6 March 1923. He had been MP here since winning the seat in the January 1922 by-election.

Election history
Conservative or Unionist candidates had won the seat at every election from 1903 onwards. 
The result at the last General election was;

Candidates
The Unionist candidate was Lt-Col. George Windsor-Clive, a retired Army Officer. His father had sat for Ludlow in the 19th century.
The Liberal candidate was Capt. Edward Calcott Pryce, a solicitor. He had been the National Liberal candidate at the last General Election. Following the mood around the country, the National Liberals and Liberals in Ludlow united behind his candidature.
The Labour party chose to intervene in the contest and fielded Percy F. Pollard.

Result
Despite the intervention of a Labour candidate, the Liberals managed to reduce the Unionist majority
The Labour candidate lost his deposit.

Aftermath
Windsor-Clive continued as MP until retiring in 1945. The Unionists/Conservatives continued to hold the seat until 2001. The Liberal Party failed to capitalize on their strong showing and local unity by failing to run a candidate either in 1923 or 1924. Neither did Pryce stand for parliament again.
The result at the following General election;

References
 Who's Who: www.ukwhoswho.com
 Debrett's House of Commons 1922
 By-Elections in British Politics by Cook and Ramsden

See also
 List of United Kingdom by-elections
 United Kingdom by-election records
 

Ludlow by-election
Ludlow by-election
Ludlow by-election
20th century in Shropshire
Ludlow
By-elections to the Parliament of the United Kingdom in Shropshire constituencies